The Fairchild family has long roots in  New England, United States. They descend from Thomas Fairchild who came from England in 1639 and settled in Stratford, Connecticut, a part of the fledgling New Haven Colony.

Genealogy
Among the notable members of the family are:
Jairus C. Fairchild (1801–1862), who was the first mayor of Madison, Wisconsin, and married Sally Blair
Cassius (1829–1868), who served in the Wisconsin State Assembly and died of wounds received in the American Civil War.
Lucius Fairchild (1831–1896), Governor of Wisconsin, He married Frances Bull (b. 1846)

Lucia (1872-1924), a painter, married Henry Brown Fuller
Blair (1877–1933), a composer

Grandison Fairchild (1792–1890), who married Nancy Harris in 1813
James Fairchild, who was President of Oberlin College
Henry Fairchild, who was President of Berea College. Henry was married to Maria Ball Babbitt
Charles Grandison Fairchild, who was President of Rollins College. Charles married Adelaide Frances Dean.
Edward Henry Fairchild
Fred Rogers Fairchild
Henry Pratt Fairchild
George Fairchild, who was President of Kansas State University. George was married to Charlotte Pearl Halsted
David Fairchild, who was a distinguished American botanist.  David married Marian Hubbard Bell, a daughter of Alexander Graham Bell
Alexander Graham Fairchild, who was known as Graham or Sandy. Graham married Elva Whitman

Other descendants
Other descendants of Thomas Fairchild include:
Muir Stephen Fairchild

Sources
Fairchild Family History